John Vaughan, 1st Viscount Lisburne (7 December 1667 – 20 March 1721), of Trawsgoed, Cardiganshire, was a Welsh
nobleman.

Biography 

The son of Edward Vaughan and grandson of Sir John Vaughan, he was created Baron Fethard and Viscount Lisburne, in the Peerage of Ireland, on 5 June 1695. He represented Cardiganshire in the House of Commons from 1694 to 1698. He was Colonel of the Cardiganshire Militia in 1697.

Vaughan married his first wife, Lady Malet Wilmot (d. 1709), daughter of John Wilmot, 2nd Earl of Rochester, on 18 August 1692. They had six children:
John Vaughan, 2nd Viscount Lisburne (c.1695–1741)
Wilmot Vaughan, 3rd Viscount Lisburne (d. 1766)
Hon. Henry Vaughan, died unmarried
Lady Anne Vaughan, married Sir John Prideaux, 6th Baronet
Lady Elizabeth Vaughan
Lady Letitia Vaughan

References

Sources 
 The parliamentary history of the principality of Wales, 1541-1895
 National Library of Wales
 Morgan, Gerald, "The Vaughans of Trawsgoed," Gomer, 1997, 
 The Peerage of the United Kingdom of Great Britain & Ireland, John Debrett, Published 1809

1667 births
1721 deaths
Lord-Lieutenants of Cardiganshire
Members of the Parliament of England (pre-1707) for constituencies in Wales
Viscounts in the Peerage of Ireland
Peers of Ireland created by William III
Whig (British political party) MPs
English MPs 1695–1698
Cardigan Militia officers
John